Yulissa Noelia Zamudio Ore (born 24 March 1976) is a Peruvian volleyball player. She competed at the 1996 Summer Olympics and the 2000 Summer Olympics.

She competed at the 2010 FIVB Volleyball Women's World Championship, She played for Alianza Lima, AD A Pinguela, and Latino Amisa.

References

External links
 

1976 births
Living people
Peruvian women's volleyball players
Olympic volleyball players of Peru
Volleyball players at the 1996 Summer Olympics
Volleyball players at the 2000 Summer Olympics
Place of birth missing (living people)
Pan American Games medalists in volleyball
Pan American Games bronze medalists for Peru
Volleyball players at the 1991 Pan American Games
Medalists at the 1991 Pan American Games
20th-century Peruvian women
21st-century Peruvian women